Městský stadion, also known as Stadion u Konopiště is a football stadium in Benešov, Czech Republic. It is the home stadium of SK Benešov. It hosted top-flight football in the 1994–95 season. The stadium holds 8,000 spectators.

The ground was the location of a pitch invasion by Sparta Prague fans on 4 March 1995, resulting in home team goalkeeper Martin Pařízek being rendered unconscious. The Czech Football Association fined the home team 30,000 Czech koruna for the incident and instructed the club to play its next home game at least  from Benešov.

References

External links
 Photo gallery and data at Erlebnis-stadion.de
 Profile at soccerway.com

Football venues in the Czech Republic
Benešov District
Czech First League venues
Sports venues completed in 1922
1922 establishments in Czechoslovakia
20th-century architecture in the Czech Republic